Hugo Chamberlain (born 14 November 1934) is a Costa Rican former sports shooter. He competed at the 1968, 1972 and 1976 Summer Olympics.

References

1934 births
Living people
Costa Rican male sport shooters
Olympic shooters of Costa Rica
Shooters at the 1968 Summer Olympics
Shooters at the 1972 Summer Olympics
Shooters at the 1976 Summer Olympics
Place of birth missing (living people)